Petrus Cornelius Jacobus "Obie" Oberholzer (born 1947) is a South African photographer.

Oberholzer was born on a small farm outside Pretoria, South Africa. He studied graphic design at Stellenbosch University in the late 1960s, and photography at the Bavarian State Institute of Photography in Munich, Germany, in the early 1970s. He returned to Germany in 1979 for his master's degree in photography.

In between he worked for the Deutsche Condor Film, as a commercial photographer and as a lecturer at the Natal Technikon. He has published numerous (and popular) coffee table books documenting his exploits through the African interior.

Oberholzer worked as professor of photography in the Fine Art Department of Rhodes University. He travels extensively producing quirky pictorial travel books. He works exclusively on medium format film and consults for a major film producer. He is a member of the German Photo Agency Bilderberg.

Published works
Ariesfontein to Zuurfontein. A Pictorial Journey (1988)
Southern Circle. Another Pictorial Journey (1989)
To Hell n Gone (1991)
Beyond Bagamoyo. A Journey from Cape to Cairo (1998)
The Hotazel Years (2000)
Raconteur Road. Shots into Africa (2002)
The Hotazel Years. 30 Years of Photographing Southern Africa (2002)
Round the Bend. Travels Around Southern Africa (2006)
Long Ago Way. In the Footsteps of Alphons Hustinx (2008)
Limburgs Momento Mori (2010)
Diesel and Dust (2012)
Karoo. Long Time Passing (2014)
Cooking in the photographer's house – written by Lynn Oberholzer (2015)

References

1947 births
Living people
South African photographers